Maryann Mahaffey (January 18, 1925 – July 27, 2006) was born in Burlington, Iowa. Mahaffey attended, and graduated from Cornell College in 1946. While in college, during the summer of 1945, Mahaffey worked at Poston Internment Camp as a Recreation Director. In this work, she became aware that the internment camp's real was to hold American citizens because of their ethnicity and not because of any crimes they had committed. Influenced by her early work experiences, Mahaffey decided to attend the University of Southern California to obtain a master's degree in Social Work. While a student in the School of Social Work, she met Herman (Hy) Dooha, whom she married in June 1950. After Mahaffey and Dooha graduated in 1951, they moved to Indianapolis where Mahaffey began work with Girl Scouts of the United States of America. She successfully ran for election in 1973 for Detroit City Council. Mahaffey was one of a few members of the Democratic Socialists of America to be elected to public office.

She served on the Detroit City Council from 1973 until 2005, from 1990 to 1998 and from 2001 to 2005 as council president. She filed a lawsuit that allowed women to run for office under their birth name, instead of their husband's surname. She led efforts to open the Detroit Athletic Club to women and helped enact an ordinance prohibiting sexual harassment of city employees. She successfully opposed the closing of the city's main hospital for the uninsured and oversaw redevelopment of several inner city neighborhoods, and championed construction along the Woodward Corridor.

Mahaffey was active in many organizations related to nutrition, women in politics, peace, and ending discrimination.

She died on July 27, 2006 from health complications related to leukemia, aged 81.

References

External links
Maryann Mahaffey Papers, Walter P. Reuther Library
MaryAnn Mahaffey Legacy Campaign, Wayne State University, School of Social Work
Maryann Mahaffey, Michigan Women's Hall of Fame

1925 births
2006 deaths
20th-century American politicians
20th-century American women politicians
Cornell College alumni
Deaths from leukemia
Detroit City Council members
Members of the Democratic Socialists of America
Politicians from Burlington, Iowa
USC Suzanne Dworak-Peck School of Social Work alumni
Wayne State University faculty
Women city councillors in Michigan
Michigan socialists
American women academics
21st-century American women